Weldon may refer to:

Places 
In Canada:
 Weldon, Saskatchewan

In England:
 Weldon, Northamptonshire

In the United States:
 Weldon, Arkansas
 Weldon, California
 Weldon, Illinois
 Weldon, Iowa
 Weldon, North Carolina
 Weldon Township, Michigan
 Weldon, Texas

People 
People named Weldon, Welldon or Wheldon
 Anthony Weldon (1583–1648), English courtier and politician
 Caroline Weldon (1844–1921), Swiss-American artist and activist
 Casey Bill Weldon (1901/1909–1972), American blues musician
 Christopher Joseph Weldon (1905–1982), American Roman Catholic bishop
 Curt Weldon (born 1947), former American Congressman (R-PA), involved in various national security roles
 Dan Wheldon (1978–2011), British racecar driver who won 2 Indianapolis 500 races
 Dave Weldon (born 1953), American Congressman (R-FL)
 Fay Weldon (1931–2023), British writer
 Felix de Weldon (1907–2003), American sculptor
 Fred Wheldon (1869–1924), English sportsman
 George Weldon (1908–1963), English conductor
 Georgina Weldon (1837–1914), British campaigner against the lunacy laws
 Huw Wheldon (1916–1986), British television presenter and executive
 James Welldon (1854–1937), English clergyman and scholar, Bishop of Calcutta from 1898 to 1902
 James Welldon (cricketer) (1847–1927), English cricketer
 Jimmy Weldon (born 1923), American voice actor and television host
 Jo Weldon (born 1962), American performer
 Joan Weldon (born Joan Louise Welton; 1930–2021), American actress and singer
 John Weldon (disambiguation), several people
 Juliet Wheldon (1950–2013), British civil servant
 Mark Weldon (born 1967), New Zealand CEO and former swimmer
 Paul Weldon, Canadian graphic designer and architect
 Richard B. Weldon Jr. (born 1958), American politician
 Thomas Weldon (disambiguation), several people
 Walter Weldon (1832–1885), British chemist, developer of the Weldon process in chlorine manufacture
 Raphael Weldon (1860–1906), British statistician
 William Weldon (officer of arms) (1837–1919), British officer at arms at the College of Arms
 William C. Weldon (born 1948), American businessman, CEO of Johnson & Johnson
 Weldon L. Kennedy (1938–2020), American special agent, Deputy Director of the FBI
 Weldon Santos de Andrade (born 1980), Brazilian football player
 J. Weldon Jones (1896–1982), American administrator and acting High Commissioner to the Philippines

Other uses 
 Weldon’s bark-grinding mill, a type of bark mill
 D. B. Weldon Library at Western University, London, Ontario, Canada
 Weldon Park Academy, also in London

See also
 Welden (surname)
 Welton (disambiguation)